S.S. Lazio finished third in Serie A this season and reached the quarter final of the Coppa Italia and the round of 32 of the UEFA Cup.

Squad

Transfers

Winter

Competitions

Serie A

League table

Results by round

Matches

Statistics

Players statistics

Top scorers
  Giuseppe Signori 24 (12)
  Pierluigi Casiraghi 14 (1)
  Aron Winter 6
  Diego Fuser 6
  Alen Bokšić 4

References

S.S. Lazio seasons
Lazio